Montague is a town in Lewis County, New York, United States. The population was 78 at the 2010 census. The town is named after Mary Montague Pierpont, the daughter of the original owner.

The town is on the western border of Lewis County. Montague is west of Lowville, the county seat, and is southeast of Watertown.

History 

The first settlements began circa 1846. In 1850, the town of Montague was formed from part of the town of West Turin. The town's population was 975 in 1880, the highest level in the town's history. The town is now known for snowmobile trails.

Geography

The western town line is the border between Jefferson and Oswego counties.

Demographics

As of the census of 2000, there were 108 people, 45 households, and 28 families residing in the town. The population density was 1.7 people per square mile (0.6/km2). There were 267 housing units at an average density of 4.1 per square mile (1.6/km2). The entire town is White.

There were 45 households, out of which 24.4% had children under the age of 18 living with them, 55.6% were married couples living together, 4.4% had a female householder with no husband present, and 35.6% were non-families. 28.9% of all households were made up of individuals, and 13.3% had someone living alone who was 65 years of age or older. The average household size was 2.40 and the average family size was 2.97.

In the town, the population was spread out, with 25.0% under the age of 18, 1.9% from 18 to 24, 28.7% from 25 to 44, 30.6% from 45 to 64, and 13.9% who were 65 years of age or older. The median age was 40 years. For every 100 females, there were 83.1 males. For every 100 females age 18 and over, there were 97.6 males.

The median income for a household in the town was $34,688, and the median income for a family was $36,250. Males had a median income of $28,750 versus $19,000 for females. The per capita income for the town was $14,598. There were 10.3% of families and 14.9% of the population living below the poverty line, including 17.9% of under eighteens and 30.0% of those over 64.

Communities and locations in Montague 
Gardners Corners – A location in the northeastern part of the town.
Hooker – A hamlet in the southwestern part of the town.
Liberty Corners – A location in the northwestern part of the town.
Parkers – A hamlet in the eastern part of the town, south of Rector.
Rector – A hamlet in the northeastern part of the town.
Sears Pond – A small lake near the center of the town.
Tug Hill Wildlife Management Area – A conservation area in the eastern part of Montague.
World Record of Snow in 24 hours (77 inches) Jan 11-12 1997

See also 
 Tug Hill Plateau

References

External links
  A history of Montague, NY
 Early history of Montague, New York
 Jan 11-12 1997 77 inches of snow (World Record in 24 hours)

Towns in Lewis County, New York